The Choctaw meridian is a meridian that governs the surveys in most of central Mississippi, USA. It begins on the Choctaw baseline, latitude 31° 54' 40" north, longitude 90° 14' 45" west from Greenwich and runs north to the south boundary of the Chickasaw cession, at latitude 34° 19' 40" north.

Sources

See also
List of principal and guide meridians and base lines of the United States

External links

Meridians and base lines of the United States
Named meridians